About Love is a 2005 film.

Three stories are told, respectively set in Tokyo, Taipei, and Shanghai. The first two stories are about a Japanese person and a Taiwanese person. The last one is set in Shanghai with a story about a Japanese man and a Chinese woman. Some of the characters can speak Japanese and some of them Mandarin. Each story encompasses an experience of a foreigner, either from Japan, Taiwan or China, with a native of a different country.

The film was directed by Shimoyama Ten, Yee Chin-yen, and Zhang Yibai. It was written by Haruko Nagatsu, Shen Wei, and Yee Chin-yen.

Plot
In Tokyo, he is a Chinese computer graphic artist seeking to enrich his exposure while she is a Japanese painter struggling to recover from a broken relationship. This is the simplest and sweetest of the three stories, starting with hidden mutual attraction and ending in their first meeting. This is also the only one of the three stories with a "sub-plot" (a really glorified use of the term) of his friendship with two other art students, both girls, one Chinese and one Japanese.

In Taipei, she is a local girl suffering from a broken heart and he is a Japanese visitor she asks in the middle of the night to help putting up a wall unit. This is the only story with a scene of brief libido drive which, however, quickly subsides. The rest of the story is on his helping her by asking her ex-boyfriend whether there is a chance of getting back together. Among the three, this is the story that plays most on the language barrier thing, with some absolutely hilarious scenes resulting.

In Shanghai, he is a Japanese student renting a room from her mother. She probably has a crush on him at first sight but keeps it deeply hidden when she sees how devoted he is to his girlfriend. But when he gets a postcard from the girlfriend ending their relationship, her attraction to him intensifies, although she never reveals it. This is the most poignant of the three stories. Romance aside, this story also takes a quick jab at the maddening scene of urban development of Shanghai.

Cast
Tokyo
Bolin Chen
Misaki Ito
Taipei
Mavis Fan
Ryō Kase
Shanghai
Li Xiaolu
Takashi Tsukamoto

References

External links

2000s romance films
2005 films
Chinese romance films
2000s Japanese-language films
Japanese romance films
2000s Mandarin-language films
Taiwanese romance films
Japanese multilingual films
Taiwanese multilingual films
Chinese multilingual films
2005 multilingual films
2000s Japanese films